Emotions